The Pharmaceutical Society of Northern Ireland (PSNI) is the regulatory and professional body for pharmacy in Northern Ireland.

As the regulatory body, it seeks to protect public safety in pharmacy by:

 setting and promoting standards for pharmacists' admission to the register and for remaining on the register; 
 maintaining a publicly accessible register of pharmacists, and pharmacy premises, in Northern Ireland; 
 handling concerns about the Fitness to Practise of registrants and taking any necessary action to protect the public; and 
 ensuring high standards of education and training for pharmacists in Northern Ireland

As the professional body, it seeks to develop the pharmacy profession in Northern Ireland in the public interest.

Oversight of health and social care regulators 

The Professional Standards Authority for Health and Social Care (PSA), is an independent body accountable to the UK Parliament, which promotes the health and wellbeing of the public and oversees the nine UK healthcare regulators, including Pharmaceutical Society of Northern Ireland.

See also
Pharmaceutical industry in the United Kingdom
List of pharmacy organizations in the United Kingdom

References

External links
Official Website

Pharmacy organisations in the United Kingdom
Medical regulation in the United Kingdom
Organizations established in 1925
Regulators of Northern Ireland
Medical and health organisations based in Northern Ireland
Medical and health regulators
1925 establishments in Northern Ireland